Akagi (written:  lit. "red castle" or  lit. "red tree") is a Japanese surname. Notable people with the surname include:

, Japanese sprint canoeist
, Japanese sprinter
, Japanese-American jazz pianist
, Japanese actor
, Japanese politician
, Japanese voice actor
Hirofumi Akagi, Japanese electrical engineer, professor

Fictional characters
, character from the anime television series Neon Genesis Evangelion
 Takenori Akagi (赤木 剛憲) and Haruko Akagi (赤木 晴子), two sibling characters from the basketball manga and anime Slam Dunk
 Daidoji Akagi, character and card personality in the L5R games and setting
, character from Denshi Sentai Denjiman
, character from Unofficial Sentai Akibaranger
Ryan Akagi, character from Infinity Train

Japanese-language surnames